The Green Knight is a 2021 epic medieval fantasy film directed, written, edited, and produced by David Lowery, adapted from the 14th-century poem Sir Gawain and the Green Knight. The film stars Dev Patel as Gawain, who sets out on a journey to test his courage and face the Green Knight. It also stars Alicia Vikander, Joel Edgerton, Sarita Choudhury, Sean Harris, and Ralph Ineson.

The Green Knight was theatrically released in the United States on July 30, 2021, by A24. The film received acclaim from critics for its cinematography, music, acting (particularly Patel's), production values, and Lowery's originality, direction and writing. It grossed over $19 million against a budget of $15 million.

Plot
On Christmas morning, Gawain is awakened in a brothel by his lover, a common woman named Essel. He returns to the king's court, where he is scolded by his mother. Gawain attends a feast at the Round Table with his uncle, the king, who invites Gawain to sit at his right hand. Elsewhere, in a tower, Gawain's mother performs a magic rite that summons the mysterious Green Knight. He barges into the king's court and states that any knight who lands a blow on him will win his green axe but must travel to the Green Chapel and receive an equal blow in return on the following Christmas. Gawain takes up the challenge. The knight yields, and Gawain, wielding the king's sword, decapitates him. The knight rises, retrieves his severed head, repeats the requisite date to Gawain, and rides away.

Gawain revels all year; the king reminds him to uphold his side of the challenge. Gawain departs on horseback for the Green Chapel; he takes the green axe and he wears a green girdle given to him by his mother. She says that as long as he wears it, he shall suffer no harm. On his journey, he crosses a battlefield littered with dead warriors, where he meets a scavenging boy. The boy directs Gawain to a stream that leads to the Green Chapel, and asks for payment. Gawain flips him a single coin. Shortly afterwards, the boy and two others ambush Gawain and steal the axe, girdle and horse, leaving Gawain tied up. He crawls to his sword and uses it to cut the ropes binding his hands and then he pursues them. At nightfall, Gawain arrives at an abandoned cottage and falls asleep in its bed. He is awakened by a young woman named Winifred, who asks him to retrieve something that she has lost from a nearby spring. He asks what he will receive in return, but is rebuffed. He finds her skull and unites it with her skeletal remains and the next morning finds the axe has been returned to him.

Gawain befriends a fox who accompanies him on his journey. They reach a castle inhabited by a Lord, who informs him that the Green Chapel is nearby, and Gawain accepts his invitation to stay. The Lord's lady resembles Essel; she makes seductive overtures toward Gawain. The two men agree that the Lord will trade the prize from his hunt for whatever Gawain receives at the castle. The next morning, the Lady presents Gawain with the green girdle, which she claims to have made herself; in exchange for it, Gawain accedes to her advances. Gawain flees and encounters the Lord in the forest, who gives him a kiss. The Lord reveals that he has captured Gawain's fox and releases it; Gawain does not offer the girdle. Gawain reaches a stream where a boat is waiting. The fox speaks to Gawain, imploring him to turn back. Gawain chases off the fox and takes the boat to the chapel, where the Knight sits in hibernation. Gawain waits through the night, and the Green Knight awakens on Christmas morning.

The Green Knight swings the axe and Gawain flinches. The Knight chides him. Gawain kneels for the blow again, but at the last moment, he scrambles away. He imagines fleeing back to the king's court and becoming king after his uncle's death. In Gawain's reverie, Essel bears his son, but Gawain abandons her, takes the child and marries a noblewoman instead. His son comes of age and dies in battle. Many years later, Gawain has become a reviled king. His castle is under siege and his family abandons him; he removes the green girdle (which he had worn the entire time since re-obtaining it from the Lady), and his head falls from his shoulders, with the crown on the ground near him.

Back in the present in the Green Chapel, Gawain kneels and removes the girdle, and tells the Knight that he is ready. The Knight praises Gawain for his bravery, then drags his finger across Gawain's throat and playfully says, "Now, off with your head", and smiles kindly.

In an after-credits scene, a little girl picks up the crown and playfully places it on her head.

Cast

Production

It was announced in November 2018 that David Lowery would direct and write a modern retelling of the 14th-century tale Sir Gawain and the Green Knight, with A24, Ley Line Entertainment, and Bron Studios set to finance.

In March 2019, Dev Patel was announced to be in negotiations to star in the film. That month, Barry Keoghan and Ralph Ineson joined the cast. In April 2019, it was announced Alicia Vikander and Erin Kellyman had been cast. Principal photography began in Ireland in March 2019. Ardmore Studios and Cahir Castle, County Tipperary, were used as filming locations, as was Charleville Castle in Tullamore, County Offaly. Weta Digital created the visual effects.

Lowery was inspired by fantasy films of the 1980s such as Willow and Excalibur. Initially, while writing the script, Lowery did not intend for Morgan le Fay to be Gawain's mother, but felt that altering the story this way allowed for her to be more naturally introduced into the narrative. Lowery stated that the intercut scenes of le Fay casting the spell that summons the Green Knight were not part of the original screenplay. However, Lowery was impressed with actress Sarita Choudhury's work with the character and the scene was written and storyboarded to be included in the Round Table scene. Lowery spent well over a year editing the scene together. The decision to design le Fay's spell in the form of a handwritten letter was also due to Lowery's fondness for letter writing, found in his other works as well. The inclusion of Saint Winifred was inspired by the mention of the Holy Head (Holywell) in the original poem. The inclusion of the highway robbery is an allusion to the 1975 film Barry Lyndon, while the battlefield where Gawain first encounters the robber is inspired by the Battle of Badon. While Gawain's ultimate fate is left ambiguous at the end of the film, Lowery originally shot a more "explicit" and "definitive" ending, but felt that it would affect audiences' feelings coming away from the film.

Set designs, such as the scene at the Round Table, included hand painted matte paintings to extend the set, a technique Lowery favored from films in the '80s and '90s. Time constraints with shooting forced cinematographer Andrew Palermo and set designer Jade Healy to plan how lighting would be built into the Round Table scene ahead of time.

Costume designer Malgosia Turzanska drew upon South American designs when designing the crowns worn by Arthur and Guinevere. Lowery also felt the designs reinforced the "saintly" status of Arthur and Guinevere as representations of Christendom in the West. The decorative plaques on Arthur's cloak referenced the creative team's various interpretations of King Arthur, and also included references to Lowery's other works, such as A Ghost Story. Turzanska also designed the golden cape worn by Gawain to represent the character's golden mantle from the original poem.

No digital visual effects were used in creating the Green Knight during the Round Table scene. Lowery preferred this in order to give the character presence on set. Actor Ralph Ineson wore prosthetics designed by Barry Gower. Scenes involving the horse alternated with a false mount that was wheeled around with a dolly, after the initial horse used for the scenes would not cooperate with Ineson. Lowery stated that the crew used practical effects to make the Green Knight appear larger, such as mounting Ineson on platforms. Digital effects were later used during the Green Knight's hibernation scene, including subtly transforming the knight's face into that of the other cast members. Speaking about the subtle humor and lightness incorporated into the otherwise dark script, Lowery stated that near the end of the film, he directed Ineson to portray the Green Knight as Santa Claus.

Themes
Lowery describes the film as being about the importance of comporting oneself with integrity and goodness over being concerned with one's legacy. Though the question of Gawain's ultimate fate is left intentionally ambiguous, Lowery stated that he wanted the possibility of Gawain being beheaded to be, "a positive thing... He faces his fate bravely, and there's honor and integrity in that. But that doesn't mean that he's dead, he's killed. He received the blow that he was dealt, and all is set right within the universe of the film." The after-credits scene showing a young girl putting on a crown has been seen as "a tease of an alternate life that Gawain leads as king of Camelot, with his daughter (possibly even mothered by Essel) a sign of the happiness he found."

The complicated relationship between Morgan le Fay and Gawain written for the film also evoked Lowery's experiences with his mother and needing to be pushed to stand on his own as an adult.

The film also deals with the conflict between mankind and nature. Lowery stated that monologue by Vikander's Lady Bertilak reflects both the symbolism of Arthurian Christian civilization being in conflict with paganism and nature and his own sentiment that nature will inevitably win over civilization and bring peace. The Green Knight's depiction as a tree-like entity also depicts nature and paganism invading the dull sanctum of the Round Table and Arthur's kingdom. This is further emphasized by Lowery's decision to portray Arthur and Guinevere as sickly, alluding to the waning control of the civilization they represent.

Release

Originally, The Green Knight was scheduled to have its world premiere at the South by Southwest film festival (SXSW) on March 16, 2020, with a full theatrical release following on May 29. The COVID-19 pandemic, however, forced the cancellation of SXSW and a mass closure of movie theatres worldwide. With no timeframe for when cinemas might reopen, some studios opted to release their new films through video on demand (VOD). Lowery told the A24 Project podcast and IndieWire that he would prefer The Green Knight to see a theatrical release, but that he was ultimately not in control over whether or not it opened on VOD.

Later, Lowery revealed that he would have been unhappy with the cut of The Green Knight that was set to debut at SXSW, and that he spent six months during the pandemic re-editing the film into something with which he could be satisfied. In December 2020, A24 announced that The Green Knight would receive a theatrical-only release, opening in US cinemas on July 30, 2021. One streaming video option was available in the US: The A24 Screening Room allowed viewers to purchase a $20 ticket that allowed them to stream The Green Knight, with an additional Q&A session with the cast and crew, during a four-hour window of their choice on the night of August 18. Although the US release progressed as planned, Entertainment Film Distributors chose to pull The Green Knight from UK cinemas two weeks before its scheduled theatrical release on August 6, citing the surge in COVID-19 cases from the Delta variant. After some deliberation, Entertainment opted to release The Green Knight simultaneously in theaters and through Amazon Prime Video on September 24 in the UK.

Home media 
The Green Knight was released on 4K Ultra HD Blu-ray, Blu-ray, DVD, and digitally through Lionsgate Home Entertainment on October 12, 2021. While the Blu-ray release contained a number of special features that highlighted certain elements of the film's production, no deleted or alternate scenes from The Green Knight were included.

Reception

Box office
The Green Knight grossed $17.2 million in the United States and Canada, and $2.8 million in other territories, for a worldwide total of $20 million.

In the United States and Canada, The Green Knight was released alongside Jungle Cruise and Stillwater, and was projected to gross around $4 million from 2,790 theaters in its opening weekend. The film made $2.9 million on its first day, including $750,000 from Thursday night previews. It ended up slightly over-performing, debuting to $6.8 million and finished second at the box office behind Jungle Cruise. The film played best in big markets such as New York City, Los Angeles, and San Francisco. The film fell 62% to $2.6 million in its second weekend, finishing sixth, then made $1.6 million in its third weekend.

Critical response
On review aggregator Rotten Tomatoes, the film has an approval rating of 89% based on 325 reviews, with an average rating of 8/10. The site's critics consensus reads, "The Green Knight honors and deconstructs its source material in equal measure, producing an absorbing adventure that casts a fantastical spell." Metacritic assigned the film a weighted average score of 85 out of 100 based on 56 critics, indicating "universal acclaim". Audiences polled by CinemaScore gave the film an average grade of "C+" on an A+ to F scale.

Writing for Vulture, Alison Willmore said that the film "is about someone who keeps waiting for external forces to turn him into the gallant, heroic figure he believes he should be", and added: "at the film's heart is a lesson that's as timeless as any legend — travel as far as you like, but you'll never be able to leave yourself behind." Brian Tallerico of RogerEbert.com gave the film a score of 4 out of 4 stars, describing the film as "one of the most memorable films of the year, a fascinating swirl of masculinity, temptation, heroism, and religion", adding: "It's a film that embeds the concept of storytelling and performance into its narrative ... while also weaving its own enchanting spell on audiences." Barry Hertz of The Globe and Mail described the film as "a beautiful, haunting and enigmatic work that reckons with the folklore's grave and tragic elements to deliver a masterpiece of blood, sex and magic", and praised Patel's performance as Gawain. 
John Nugent of Empire gave the film a score of 5 out of 5 stars, describing it as "a rivetingly weird and exceptionally beautiful fantasy film that offers no easy answers but ponders the biggest questions", and wrote that the film was "Revisionist Fantasy, doing for the genre what the likes of Robert Altman or Alejandro Jodorowsky did with their Revisionist Westerns: bringing an avant-garde flair and an ambiguous morality to a previously occasionally cheesy and childlike world."

Keith Watson of Slant Magazine gave the film a score of 2.5 out of 4 stars, describing it as "a self-consciously revisionist take on Camelot lore", and wrote that the film "smooths out the enduring mysteries, opaque psychology, and narrative idiosyncrasies of Sir Gawain and the Green Knight, resulting in a work that's only superficially more daring and enigmatic than its source material."  Simon Abrams of TheWrap wrote that "while there's a lot of commendable chutzpah and curious longing baked into The Green Knight, the movie's never as compelling as it is unusual."

Accolades

See also
 Gawain Poet
 Matter of Britain
 List of works based on Arthurian legends

References

External links
 
 

2020s fantasy drama films
2021 adventure films
2021 drama films
2021 fantasy films
2021 films
2021 LGBT-related films
American adventure drama films
American Christmas films
American epic films
American fantasy adventure films
American fantasy drama films
American sword and sorcery films
American LGBT-related films
A24 (company) films
2021 independent films
Arthurian films
Films based on poems
Films directed by David Lowery
Films postponed due to the COVID-19 pandemic
Films scored by Daniel Hart
Films set in castles
Films shot in County Wicklow
Films about wizards
2020s English-language films
2020s American films